Jurong West Central is a subzone of Jurong West, located in the West Region of Singapore. This is the town centre of Jurong West.

Transport

Roads
There are 4 main roads in this subzone – Boon Lay Way, Jalan Boon Lay, Jurong West Avenue 4/2 and Pioneer Road North.

Public transport

Rail

Mass Rapid Transit
The East West Line threads through the subzone along Street 63, with 2 stations (Boon Lay and Pioneer), situated at the Eastern and Western ends of the subzone. By 2025, there will be the Jurong Region Line, which would ply through the Eastern end of the subzone.

Bus
The Boon Lay Bus Interchange is situated here, along Central 3, within Jurong Point Shopping Centre and next to Boon Lay MRT Station.

Healthcare
At the junction of Central 1 and Street 64, there is a government healthcare institution named Jurong Medical Centre.

A polyclinic, Pioneer Family Healthcare Centre near Pioneer MRT station along Street 61 started operations in November 2017 and opened in February 2018.

Recreation
The Frontier Community Club is situated at the junction of Street 64 and Central 3, it is co-located with Jurong West Public Library. There are two parks – Jurong Central Park and Jurong West Neighbourhood Park. They can jog along the Jurong West Park Connector. In addition, there is Jurong West Public Library.

There is also SAFRA Clubhouse at Jurong, which is situated at the south-eastern fringe of the subzone, near to Boon Lay MRT Station. The Jurong West Sports and Recreation Centre is located at the western fringe of the subzone along Pioneer Road North.

Commercial
There are 2 Shopping malls in this subzone, namely Jurong Point and Pioneer Mall. There are retail spaces at the concourse level of Pioneer and Boon Lay MRT stations, of which the one at Boon Lay is known as Boon Lay Xchange.

There will be a market and hawker centre located adjacent to Pioneer Mall along Street 61 which is expected to complete in 2017.

Education
There are 4 education institutions here, namely
Jurong West Primary School
Jurong West Secondary School
Frontier Primary School
Boon Lay Secondary School
At the fringes of the subzone, there are 2 education institutions, namely
Westgrove Primary School
River Valley High School, Singapore

Housing
There are a total of 188 housing blocks in this subzone, consisting of 176 (6 under construction) Public apartments and 12 blocks of Private Condominium. Most of the flats were built in 1999 – 2000, and earthworks had begun on 18 June 1995.

Public Apartments

HDB estates at N6

The Public Apartments and the associated infrastructure are managed and maintained by West Coast Town Council.

Private Housing

Politics
The northern portion is referred to Boon Lay constituency, part of the West Coast GRC. Its MP is Desmond Lee.

The southern portion is referred to Pioneer constituency. Its MP is Patrick Tay.

Both portions are separated by Street 61/2 and Central 1.

Neighbouring Areas

References

External links
West Coast Town Council
South West Community Development Council

Pioneer, Singapore
Places in Singapore